There are four National parks in North Macedonia: Pelister, Mavrovo, Galičica and Šar Mountains.

See also
 Wildlife of North Macedonia

References 

North Macedonia
 
National parks
National parks